SeAH Steel Holdings (formerly SeAH Steel Corporation) is a South Korean holding company located in Seoul, South Korea. It was founded as a steel manufacturer in 1960 by Lee Jong-Deok with the name of Pusan Steel Pipe Industry Corporation.

In 2018, the SeAH Steel Corporation split into two separate entities, SeAH Steel Holdings, a holding group for SeAh's foreign affiliate companies, and SeAH Steel, which kept the steel manufacturing activities. 

The company operates seven steel mills worldwide with locations in the United States, Vietnam, United Arab Emirates, and Italy. In August 2020, SeAH started negotiating with the UK government to construct the world's biggest turbine monopile facility.

SeAH Steel 
SeAH Steel remains the main subsidiary of SeAH Steel Holdings after it transitioned into two separate entities in 2018.

SeAH Steel is the largest Korean steel pipe manufacturer and its main products consist of steel pipes, titanium tubes, stainless steel pipes and galvanized color steel sheets. It currently runs four plants in South Korea, located in Pohang, Gunsan, Suncheon and Changwon.

Management 
As of 2022, SeAH Steel Holdings corporate leadership is headed by President and CEO Lee Joo-sung. He plays a primary role in managing the company’s business operations and diversifying the company activities. Lee Joo-sung led SeAH Steel Holdings into the renewable energy market by creating the UK-based subsidiary SeAH Wind and is in negotiations with the British government to construct the world's biggest offshore wind power facility.

Other affiliates 

 SeAH Coated Metal
 SeAH Steel America
 State Pipe & Supply
 SeAH Steel USA
 SeAH Steel UAE
 SeAH Japan
 SeAH Steel Vina
 Vietnam Steel Pipe
 INOX TECH (SeAH Steel Europe)
 SeAH Steel Indonesia
 Landmark Steel

References 

Steel companies
Steel industry
Chaebol
Steel companies of South Korea
Companies based in Seoul
Companies listed on the Korea Exchange
South Korean companies established in 1960